The Balkan Universities Network or Balkan Universities Association (BAUNAS) is an association of universities in Southeast Europe. In its present form the body was created after the breakup of the SFR Yugoslavia and the end of the Yugoslav Wars. Association facilitates the regional cooperation in the context of expansion of higher education sector caused by the establishment of new private and public universities (in addition to traditional schools with their existing institutional links). 

Association helped in the exchange of experiences in the implementation of the Bologna Process at Balkan universities. The aim of the network is the exchange of know how and experience in research and education, mutual acceptance of certificates, encouragement of professors and students for more mobility between the universities and the use of support programs for student exchange. Besides bilateral meetings, conferences rotating between the member universities take place. 

The 2010 conference was organized by the Trakya University in Edirne.Rector Enver Duran Trakya University Edirne (Turkey), President; Dean Hilmi Ibar Trakya University Edirne (Turkey), Vice-President; Rector Faruk Čaklovica University of Sarajevo (Bosnia and Herzegovina), Member; Rector Dhori Kule University of Tirana (Albania), Member; Rector Ioannis P Gerothanassis, University Ioannina (Greece), Member; Rector Anelia Klissarova, Varna Medical University (Bulgaria), Member.

In addition to the bilateral meetings, conferences of the Balkan universities take place at changing member locations.  The 2018 meeting took place in the University of Tetovo.

In 2016, the Rector of Trakya University Erhan Tabakoglu in Edirne has taken over the general secretariat of the association.
Since 2018, Enver Duran has been honorary president and Pericles A. Mitkas president of BAUNAS. The new additional goal is to work more closely with the network of Black Sea Universities Network (BSUN).

Members

Guest members
 Baku State University
 Baden-Wuerttemberg Cooperative State University Loerrach
 University of Graz

See also 

 National Institutes of Technology – 31 leading public engineering universities in India

Further reading 
 Enver Duran: Challenges of Higher Education Institutions in the Balkans, III Balkan Universities Network Meeting, Trakya Universität Edirne Mai 2010, 
 Manfred G. Raupp: ''Lörrach Symposium - Lörrach Sempozyumu, Trakya Universität Edirne Mai 2011,

Notes and references
Notes:
 
References:

College and university associations and consortia in Europe
International college and university associations and consortia